The Packard-Bentley Mavis is a one-off racing car.

The car was built by Vintage Sports-Car Club member and Napier-Bentley owner Chris Williams, and debuted at the Cholmondeley Pageant of Power in July 2010.  

The Packard-Bentley is based on a 1930 Bentley 8-litre chassis, highly modified. The car also has 24 exhaust pipes, reflecting its engine's twin-port design. The steering column is offset and angled to allow it to clear the huge engine block.

The car is a very popular spectator attraction, both static and while being driven. As of 2019, it is now housed in Technik Museum Speyer, Germany, where it has previously featured in their "Brazzeltag" convention.

References

External links 
 Cholmondeley Pageant of Power
Packard aero-engines at enginehistory.org

Racing cars
Cars powered by aircraft engines